EF1 may refer to:
 EF1 item allocation - a rule for fair allocation of indivisible objects among people with different preferences.
 A tornado intensity rating on the Enhanced Fujita scale.